Sheikh Hamad Al Thani may refer to Qatari royalty, with Hamad given name and Al Thani as clan name:

 Hamad bin Abdullah Al Thani (1896–1948), full name Hamad bin Abdullah bin Jassim bin Muhammed Al Thani, father of the preceding Emir of Qatar, grandfather of the current Emir
 Hamad bin Jassim bin Hamad Al Thani (born 1959), full name Hamad bin Jassim bin Hamad bin Abdullah bin Jassim bin Muhammed Al Thani, coup leader, his grandson
 Hamad bin Khalifa Al Thani (born 1952), former Emir of Qatar, his grandson
 Hamad bin Suhaim Al Thani (born 1958), full name Hamad bin Suhaim bin Hamad bin Abdullah bin Jassim bin Muhammed Al Thani, his grandson
 Hamad bin Khalid Al Thani (born 1952), full name Hamad bin Khalid bin Hamad bin Abdullah bin Jassim bin Muhammed Al Thani, his grandson
 Hamad bin Jassim bin Jaber Al Thani (born 1959), full name Hamad bin Jassim bin Jaber bin Muhammad Al Thani, cousin of Hamad bin Abdullah